Microglossum viride is a species of fungi in the family Geoglossaceae.  They are commonly called green earth tongues.

Etymology
The word Microglossum comes from the Greek words mikrós + glōssa, and literally means "small tongue". The species epithet, viride, comes from the Latin viridis for "green."

History
Microglossum viride was described by Christiaan Hendrik Persoon in 1797 as Geoglossum viride. In 1879 it was moved into the genus Microglossum.

Similar species
Collections of green Microglossum with scaly stipe had been commonly called M. viride. In 2014 morphological and molecular data revealed another taxon hidden under this name that was segregated and described as new, i.e. Microglossum griseoviride (its epithet meaning "grey-green"). Aside of microscopic characters like spore size, they are distinct also macroscopically – true M. viride has yellow to olive colour and prefers wet habitats (e.g. on wet ground around brooks, often among hepatics) whereas M. griseoviride has colder colours, greyish green to bluegreen and grows far from water in litter from broad-leaved trees. There is also a group of green to bluegreen species around Microglossum nudipes that have stipe without scales and can be usually found on grasslands and pastures. As of 2018, ongoing research of their diversity resulted in five new species being recently described from Europe.

Location
Microglossum viride species are found in woodlands in North America, Australia and Europe.

References

External links
 Microglossum viride at Mushroom Observer - 
 Microglossum viride Distribution Map - 
 Index Fungorum Microglossum viride record - 
 California Fungi - Microglossum viride - 
 Key to Club Fungi in the PNW - 

Helotiales
Fungi of Australia
Taxa named by Christiaan Hendrik Persoon